Kill the Sexplayer is a single and an EP by American post-hardcore band Girls Against Boys, released on February 13, 1995 by Touch and Go Records. There were two versions released. The first version was a promotional single, mainly used to promote the song's appearance in the film Clerks, and had only consisted of one track. The second version was released as an EP, which consisted of the title track and three tracks recorded live on Bernard Lenoir's radio program.

Track listing

Personnel 
Adapted from the Kill the Sexplayer liner notes.

 Girls Against Boys
 Alexis Fleisig – drums
 Eli Janney – organ, vibraphone, bass guitar
 Scott McCloud – lead vocals, guitar
 Johnny Temple – bass guitar, sampler

Production and additional personnel
 Ted Niceley – production
 Jean-Philippe Thomas – engineering (2, 4)

Release history

References

1995 EPs
Girls Against Boys albums
Touch and Go Records EPs
Albums produced by Ted Niceley